This article comprises three sortable tables of major mountain peaks of greater North America.

The summit of a mountain or hill may be measured in three principal ways:
The topographic elevation of a summit measures the height of the summit above a geodetic sea level.  The first table below ranks the 100 highest major summits of greater North America by elevation.
The topographic prominence of a summit is a measure of how high the summit rises above its surroundings.  The second table below ranks the 50 most prominent summits of greater North America.
The topographic isolation (or radius of dominance) of a summit measures how far the summit lies from its nearest point of equal elevation.  The third table below ranks the 50 most isolated major summits of greater North America.



Highest major summits

Of the 100 highest major summits of greater North America, only Denali exceeds  elevation, 11 peaks exceed , and all 100 peaks exceed  elevation.

Of these 100 peaks, 81 are located in the United States, 17 in Canada, seven in México, and one in Guatemala.  Six of these peaks lie on the Canada-United States border.

Most prominent summits

Of the 50 most prominent summits of greater North America, only Denali exceeds  of topographic prominence, Mount Logan exceeds , four peaks exceed , 17 peaks exceed , and all 50 peaks exceed  of topographic prominence.  All of these peaks are ultra-prominent summits.

Of these 50 peaks, 27 are located in the United States, 19 in Canada, three in México, and one each in Guatemala, Costa Rica, Greenland, the Dominican Republic, and Haiti.  Four of these peaks lie on the Canada-United States border.

Most isolated major summits

Of the 50 most isolated major summits of greater North America, only Denali exceeds  of topographic isolation, Gunnbjørn Fjeld exceeds , four peaks exceed , nine peaks exceed , 35 peaks exceed , and all 50 peaks exceed  of topographic isolation.

Of these 50 peaks, 16 are located in Canada, 15 in the United States, 7 in Greenland, 6 in México, and one each in the Dominican Republic, Costa Rica, Guatemala, Guadeloupe, Puerto Rico, and Cuba.

Gallery

See also

North America
Geography of North America
Geology of North America
Lists of mountain peaks of North America

List of the highest major summits of North America
List of the highest islands of North America
List of the most prominent summits of North America
List of the ultra-prominent summits of North America
List of the major 100-kilometer summits of North America
List of extreme summits of North America
List of mountain peaks of Greenland
List of mountain peaks of Canada
List of mountain peaks of the Rocky Mountains
List of mountain peaks of the United States
List of mountain peaks of México
List of mountain peaks of Central America
List of mountain peaks of the Caribbean
:Category:Mountains of North America
commons:Category:Mountains of North America
Physical geography
Topography
Topographic elevation
Topographic prominence
Topographic isolation

Notes

References

External links

Natural Resources Canada (NRC)
Canadian Geographical Names @ NRC
United States Geological Survey (USGS)
Geographic Names Information System @ USGS
United States National Geodetic Survey (NGS)
Geodetic Glossary @ NGS
NGVD 29 to NAVD 88 online elevation converter @ NGS
Survey Marks and Datasheets @ NGS
Instituto Nacional de Estadística, Geografía e Informática (INEGI)
Sistemas Nacionales Estadístico y de Información Geográfica (SNEIG)
Bivouac.com
Peakbagger.com
Peaklist.org
Peakware.com
Summitpost.org

 

Geography of North America

 
North America, List Of Mountain Peaks Of
North America, List Of Mountain Peaks Of
North America, List Of Mountain Peaks Of